The 2007 Tennis Masters Cup was a men's tennis tournament played on indoor hard courts. It was the 38th edition of the year-end singles championships, the 33rd edition of the year-end doubles championships, and was part of the 2007 ATP Tour. It took place at the Qizhong Forest Sports City Arena in Shanghai, China, from November 11 through November 18, 2007.

Finals

Singles

 Roger Federer defeated  David Ferrer 6–2, 6–3, 6–2
It was Roger Federer's 8th title of the year, and his 53rd overall. It was his 4th year-end championships title, and his 2nd consecutive one.

Doubles

 Mark Knowles /  Daniel Nestor defeated  Simon Aspelin /  Julian Knowle 6–2, 6–3

Points and prize money

RR is points or prize money won in the round robin stage.
1 Prize money for doubles is per team.
2 Pro-rated on a per-match basis: $50,000 = 1 match, $75,000 = 2 matches, $100,000 = 3 matches
3 3 Pro-rated on a per-match basis: $20,000 = 1 match, $35,000 = 2 matches, $50,000 = 3 matches
An undefeated singles champion would earn the maximum 750 points and $1,200,000 in prize money ($100,000 participation, $300,000 undefeated round robin, $300,000 semifinal win, $500,000 final win)
An undefeated doubles champion would earn the maximum 750 points and $220,000 in prize money ($50,000 participation, $45,000 undefeated round robin, $25,000 semifinal win, $100,000 final win). While each of them would get 1,500 points, the $220,000 would be split, so $110,000 for each member of the team.

Points breakdown

Singles

Doubles

References

External links
Official website
Singles draw
Doubles draw

 
Tennis Masters Cup
2007
Tennis tournaments in China
Sports competitions in Shanghai
2007 in Chinese tennis